José Antonio Díaz García (born 20 July 1964) is a Mexican politician from the National Action Party. From 2006 to 2009 he served as Deputy of the LX Legislature of the Mexican Congress representing Puebla.

References

1964 births
Living people
People from Puebla (city)
National Action Party (Mexico) politicians
21st-century Mexican politicians
Politicians from Puebla
Universidad Popular Autónoma del Estado de Puebla alumni
Deputies of the LX Legislature of Mexico
Members of the Chamber of Deputies (Mexico) for Puebla